Anthony Greene (born August 29, 1949) is an American football former safety in the NFL who played for the Buffalo Bills.  He played college football at the University of Maryland.

References

1949 births
Living people
People from Gaithersburg, Maryland
American football safeties
Buffalo Bills players
American Conference Pro Bowl players
Maryland Terrapins football players
Gaithersburg High School alumni